Kammavaripalem is a village in Prakasam district of the Indian state of Andhra Pradesh.

References 
List of Mandal Parishad/Zilla Parishad Primary Schools, Telugu Medium
Demographic data

Villages in Prakasam district